Great Mosque of Banten is a historic mosque in Old Banten, 10 km north of Serang, Indonesia. The 16th-century mosque was one of the few surviving remnants of what used to be the port city of Banten, the most prosperous trading center in the Indonesian archipelago after the fall of Demak Sultanate in mid-16th century.

History

The Great Mosque of Banten shows eclectic design, a proof of the international influence in Banten at the time of its construction in 1552. The mosque was constructed in Javanese style during the reign of Sultan Maulana Yusuf, the third Sultan of Banten Sultanate, in Dzulhijjah  966 (1566 CE).

A Javanese-styled pawestren (side hall, used for female's praying hall) was added during the reign of Maulana Muhammad (1580-1586). The southern serambi (porch) of the mosque was converted into a tomb containing about 15 graves.

In 1632, a 24-meter minaret was added to the mosque complex. The minaret was designed by a Chineseman Cek-ban-cut. Around similar period the Dutch-styled tiyamah was added to the mosque following the design of Hendrik Lucaasz Cardeel, a Dutchman who was converted to Islam.

The design elements of the Great Mosque of Banten have religious and cultural influences from Islam, Hinduism, Buddhism, the Chinese and the Dutch. These cultures have imposed their values and styles on the architecture of the Great Mosque of Banten, but have also blended well with the Javanese culture of Indonesia. For example, there is a blend of Hindu and Javanese architectural elements that consist of Dutch brick construction. Cardeel incorporated early European Baroque architectural features in his design of the mosque, which can mainly be seen in the minaret, tiyamah building, and mosque wall. This has set the Great Mosque of Banten apart from other traditional mosques in Indonesia, as there is a medley of different cultures embedded in its architectural design and elements.

Architecture

Overall structure 
The overall structure of the mosque is often considered to have made reference to the human body according to concepts related to the human body in traditional Javanese culture. According to the concept, the building can be divided up into three parts: the head, the body, and the foot. Respectively, the roof of the Great Mosque of Banten represents the head, the wall represents the body and the stumps represent the feet.

The roof of the mosque was built in joglo style, a traditional Javanese roof style. It consists of tiered levels, which represents different characteristics of the Islamic faith. The tiered levels of the roof, in order of bottom to top, represent: all Muslims, the Faithful, the Benefactor, the Sincere, and the Cautious. The roof is of a triangular style, with the tip of the roof representing the creator, Allah, at the higher point of the Islamic faith. This triangular style is similar to the form of a bamboo shoot. This follows the traditional pyramidal roof style of the typical Javanese mosque.

The body of the mosque consists of 24 columns (tiang soko) that are octagonal in shape and are placed in the middle of the mosque in order to support the roof. There are four main columns and 20 support ones, following typical Javanese culture. Each column has a pumpkin-like shape and a lotus flower design at the top and bottom. This lotus design symbolizes the presence and rise of Islam in Indonesia and is also a symbol of strength for converted Muslims as they engage in a new lifestyle. The pumpkin shape is significant due to its importance as a food source during Indonesia's dry season. The circular shape of the column comes from Buddhism influence, as it represents the balance of forces from different directions and focus of energy in the mosque. The existence of this is analogous to the different influences of Islam, Hinduism, and Buddhism working together in the architectural style of the Great Mosque of Banten.

The feet (umpak) of the mosque supports the 24 columns and symbolizes the connection between the ground and Allah. As such, the umpak of the mosque acts as the foundation, bringing the mosque to life by holding it up.

Layout 

Being a port town, the Great Mosque of Banten features eclectic elements, which appear in the overall enclosed space of the mosque, the minaret, and the tiyamah building. The minaret is a popular icon of the Great Mosque of Banten. It is a 24 meter high, brick minaret, with a 10 meter in diameter octagonal base. The shape is reminiscent of a lighthouse. The architecture features a mix of Indian Mughal pattern and ancient candi decoration.

Beside the mosque is a two-floored building built in the 17th-century Dutch style. This building, known as the tiyamah, was erected at the order of Sultan Haji of Banten and designed by a Dutchman, Hendrik Lucaasz Cardeel. Cardeel converted to Islam, became a member of the Banten court with the title Pangeran Wiraguna, and designed this building which now stands on the southwest side of the Great Mosque. It is still used as a center for Islamic study. The tiyamah building is where social gatherings are held, and it is the only traditional mosque in Indonesia that has such building next to it. The tiyamah building was built to accommodate the tropical climate of Indonesia, which is seen through the open-floor plan with maximum ventilation and lighting and through features that protect the building such as a roof with acute angles to handle heavy rain. Construction materials included wood, bricks, and tiles. Windows and doors have a symmetrical design of horizontal and vertical lines.

Also included in the Great Mosque of Banten is a women's prayer room, called a pewastren, and several tombs in the mosque complex, such as the tomb of Sultan Maulana Hasanuddin and his wife, Sultan Ageng Tirtayasa, and that of Sultan Abu Nasir Abdul Qohhar. Because these were included in the layout of the mosque, the mosque's 24 columns were not located in the centre of the room, like they traditionally are. Unlike most of the traditional mosques that have a square base, the Great Mosque of Banten is built in a rectangular base. This is primarily because of the inclusion of the pewastren and the tombs.

Exterior 
In a typical architecture of Javanese mosque, the Great Mosque of Banten consists of the main prayer hall and a covered veranda (serambi). The serambi is a semi-attached porch-like structure which provides entrance to the main prayer hall. The main prayer features a five-tiered roof supported by four main posts (saka guru). The three uppermost tier is arranged rather uniquely, appearing more like a Chinese pagoda than the regular multi-tiered roof of Javanese architecture. There is a dispute over the original number of the tiers of the main prayer hall; sketches of the city in 1596, 1624, 1661 and 1726 shows the number of the tier as not more than three tiers, while Valentijn (1858) mentioned the number of the tier is five as it is today. The covered verandas were added to the main mosque building, built in the north and south side of the mosque.

Interior 
The interior of the Great Mosque of Banten is not very decorative or intricate as there is no calligraphy or ornamental art forms. The only decorative elements can be found in the air ventilation openings, where there are geometrical patterns. This minimalist style of interior design is similar to that of the Pecinan Tinggi Mosque, a mosque for the Chinese community of Indonesia.

There is large Buddhist influence in the column stumps of the mosque. The circular shape and form of the detailed lotus motif at the top and bottom of each column comes from a Chinese cultural approach, which has Buddhist influence. This round circular shape brings balance to the mosque, as it represents balance of all forces and strength. Additionally, it has been found that this detailed lotus motif is compatible with the Buddhist mediation layers, known as the sixty levels. This compatibility is seen through the columns being the focal point of prayers that occur in the mosque, their energy traveling up the columns to the highest point of the mosque.

Sociocultural activities in the Mosque Complex 
There are three main areas of the Great Mosque of Banten complex: the Great Mosque, the tiyamah building, and the cemetery area. The tiyamah building served as a space for social gatherings while the cemetery remained a cultural tradition that housed the graves of royalty. The cemetery had the most influence on the social and cultural activities that occur within the Mosque complex. Many visitors of the Great Mosque complex were there with the intention of visiting the tombs and graves of Sultan Maulana Hasanuddin and his family members. This influenced the type of traditional activities that were carried out in the area.

The Great Mosque of Banten was initially built to function as a location for Muslims to fulfill their religious needs and perform religious activities. Concurring with the needs for more to learn about Islam, Indonesia also had a rising Muslim-convert population. The variety and coexistence of architectural forms that reference cultural exchanges with other religious including Buddhism and Hinduism seen in the Great Mosque of Banten are meant to symbolize this convergence.

See also

List of mosques in Indonesia

References

Works cited

 
 
 

Tourist attractions in Banten
Religious buildings and structures in Java
Religious buildings and structures completed in 1566
Mosques in Indonesia
16th-century mosques
Banten